In printing, set-off is the term given to the unwanted transfer of ink from one printed sheet to another. The problem can occur with most types of printing, and is avoided by the use of slipsheets between copies (so any ink transfer occurs onto discardable paper) or anti-set-off spray powder.

The term in offset printing also refers to the unwanted transfer of ink to rollers and friction points throughout the printing press. Ink that is not properly dried or set can build up over time and cause marking on the finished product.

Additionally, some offset printing applications add moisture back into the paper template after an offset heat set dryer. Water that does not have enough hardness will break down the calcium carbonate in the paper and cause build-up or set-off on later components of the press.

See also
lithography
offset printing
letterpress printing
printmaking
printing press
color printing - Colour Printing
MAN Roland
Koenig & Bauer - KBA
Komori
Heidelberger Druckmaschinen - Heidelberg
See also Printing

External links
 How To Control Setoff In Offset Printing
 Learn about printing — International Paper
 Glossary of printing terms — International Paper

References

Quality issues in printing
Printing terminology